Chilocremastis is a monotypic snout moth genus. Its only species, Chilocremastis castanias, is found in the Congo Basin. Both the genus and species were first described by Edward Meyrick in 1934.

References

Phycitinae
Monotypic moth genera
Moths of Africa